Mandy Lee may refer to:
 Mandy Lee, lead singer of American band MisterWives
 "Mandy Lee", 1899 song by American singer Arthur Collins
 "Mandy Lee/Bottle Up and Go", 1969 song by British singer Kevin Coyne

See also
Amanda Lee (disambiguation)